Heirs to the Land is a 2022 Spanish television series based on the novel of the same name by Ildefonso Falcones. Set in 14th-century Barcelona, it is a sequel to Cathedral of the Sea. The series premiered on Netflix on 15 April 2022, to be followed by a run on Atresmedia and Televisió de Catalunya.

Premise 
Set in 14th-century Barcelona, the plot follows the story of Hugo Llor, who dreams of becoming a ship builder.

Cast

Production and release 

Heirs to the Land is based on the novel  by Ildefonso Falcones, published by Grijalbo in 2016. The series was set for a exclusive release on Netflix for a 12-month initial streaming window, followed by a 3-month window on Atresmedia and Televisió de Catalunya.

The series premiered on Netflix on 15 April 2022.

External links

References 

2022 Spanish television series debuts
2020s Spanish drama television series
Television series set in the 14th century
Television shows set in Barcelona
Television series based on Spanish novels
Television shows filmed in Spain
Television series by Diagonal TV